Cucumis metuliferus, commonly called the African horned cucumber, horned melon, spiked melon, jelly melon, or kiwano, is an annual vine in the cucumber and melon family Cucurbitaceae. Its fruit has horn-like spines, hence the name "horned melon". The ripe fruit has orange skin and lime-green, jelly-like flesh. C. metuliferus is native to Southern Africa, in South Africa, Namibia, Botswana, Zambia, Zimbabwe, Mozambique, and Angola.

Kiwano is a traditional food plant in Africa. Along with the gemsbok cucumber (Acanthosicyos naudinianus) and tsamma (citron melon), it is one of the few sources of water during the dry season in the Kalahari Desert. In northern Zimbabwe, it is called gaka or gakachika, and is primarily used as a snack or salad, and rarely for decoration. It can be eaten at any stage of ripening.

The fruit's taste has been compared to a combination of banana and passionfruit, cucumber and zucchini or a combination of banana, cucumber and lime. A small amount of salt or sugar can increase the flavor, but the seed content can make eating the fruit less convenient than many common fruits.

Some also eat the peel, which is very rich in vitamin C and dietary fiber.

Germination
Seeding optimum germination temperatures are from 20 to 35°C (68 to 95°F). Germination is delayed at 12°C (54°F), and inhibited at temperatures lower than 12°C or above 35°C. Thus, it is recommended to sow in trays and transplant into the field at the true two=leaf stage. The best time for transplanting into an open field is in the spring, when soil and air temperatures rise to around 15°C (59°F).

Pests and diseases
Kiwano is resistant to several root-knot nematodes; two accessions were found to be highly resistant to watermelon mosaic virus, but very sensitive to the squash mosaic virus. Some accessions were found to succumb to Fusarium wilt. Resistance to greenhouse whitefly was reported. Kiwano was reported to be resistant to powdery mildew, but in Israel, powdery mildew and squash mosaic virus attacked kiwano fields and control measures had to be taken.

Gallery

References

External links
 

metuliferus
Desert fruits
Fruits originating in Africa
Melons